Diospyros seychellarum, locally known as bwa sagay, is a rare endemic plant from the Seychelles. It occurs on the islands of Mahé, Praslin, Silhouette and Felicite.

Description
The habitat for this small forest tree or shrub is in well-drained situations or in more open rocky areas, often on granite based soils. Diospyros seychellarum is particularly associated with native palm and pandan scrub habitats.

The Bwa sagay plant has been used in traditional medicine.

Conservation
Diospyros seychellarum faces threats from invasive weeds such as cinnamon and jackfruit. As well as disturbance from logging and land clearing for agriculture. Certain populations are conserved in Seychelles National Parks. It is an IUCN Red List vulnerable species.

References 

seychellarum
Medicinal plants of Africa
Vulnerable plants
Endemic flora of Seychelles